was a village located in Higashiibaraki District, Ibaraki Prefecture, Japan.

On February 1, 2005, Katsura, along with the town of Jōhoku (also from Higashiibaraki District), and the village of Nanakai (from Nishiibaraki District), was merged to create the town of Shirosato and no longer exists as an independent municipality.

As of 2003, the village had an estimated population of 6,924 and a density of 149.45 persons per km². The total area was 46.33 km².

External links
 Official website of Shirosato 

Dissolved municipalities of Ibaraki Prefecture